General Spencer may refer to:

Augustus Spencer (1807–1893), British Army general
Brent Spencer (c. 1760–1828), British Army general
Charles Spencer, 3rd Duke of Marlborough (1706–1758), British Army general
Jeremy Spencer-Smith (1917–1985), British Army major general
Joseph Spencer (1714–1789),  Continental Army major general
Larry O. Spencer (born 1954), U.S. Air Force general